The Bitoi River is a river located in Morobe Province, Papua New Guinea. The river flows into the Huon Gulf south of Salamaua.

References

Rivers of Papua New Guinea
Morobe Province